The Peguis Juniors are a junior "B" ice hockey team based in Peguis, Manitoba. They are members of the Keystone Junior Hockey League (KJHL). The franchise was founded in 1994.

History
In 2006, Fisher River Cree Nation partnered with Peguis for three seasons. The team was renamed Two Nations River Hawks.

The Juniors played in the Peguis Arena, but on the early morning of February 19, 2007, the arena was lost to fire. After the fire the Juniors looked for a new arena to play their home games and from 2007 to 2011 the team played all their home games at the Fisher Branch Arena in Fisher Branch, Manitoba. In 2011–12 season, they played all their home games in Fisher River, Manitoba, at the Fisher River Arena.

Season-by-season records
Note: GP = Games played, W = Wins, L = Losses, T = Ties, OTL = Overtime Losses, Pts = Points, GF = Goals for,   GA = Goals against

Records as of 2017–18 regular season.

Keystone Cup history
Western Canadian Jr. B Championships  (Northern Ontario to British Columbia)Six teams in round-robin play. 1st vs. 2nd for gold/silver; 3rd vs. 4th for bronze.

Franchise records

These are the top-ten point, goal, and assist scorers in franchise history.

Note: Pos = Position; GP = Games played; G = Goals; A = Assists; Pts = Points

Single-season leaders

Team captains
Spencer Sutherland, 2012–present
Jarrett Cochrane, 2011–2012
Derrick Sinclair, 2009–2011
Neil Stevenson, 2007–2008
Mervin Garson, 2004–2007
Allan Thompson 1999–2004

Head coaches
Farron Cochrane 2004–2016
Michael Spence 2016–2020
Jason Smith 2020–present

References

External links
Peguis First Nation

Ice hockey teams in Manitoba